The Blue Lamps (also Blue Lanterns) is a novel written by the Syrian writer Hanna Mina.

The Novel 
The Blue Lamps is a story about a group of simple people in the days of World War II, the community in Latakia City, Syria in general, and how the lamps are painted blue to simulate the view of distant beacons covered by fog during the war time. We observe this through the eyes of the protagonist ‘faris’ and his character’s evolution from a youngster to an adult man. The novelist went beyond the concept of "The Impact of War on People," depicting a full life in which the war crisis plays a major role, but the group of people who disturb the book's Deuteronomy’s, their daily lives, how they treat each other, how they struggle to live, how their own interests relate to their nation's issues, and how they understand the struggle, plays a larger role. Despite the fact that the narrative begins and finishes with ‘faris’, he is not the sole hero in the story. A variety of destitute families’ dwell in the Grand Home, including “Um sqr”, the old woman who serves in the house and her young unemployed son and the Black-Mariam and her husband, Nayef, who’s nicknamed stallion, which they have their own narrative.  

 The novel was shown on a Syrian television series, and translated into Russian and Chinese.

References 

Syrian novels
Arabic-language novels
1945 novels